The Kennkarte was the basic identity document in use inside Germany (including occupied incorporated territories) during the Third Reich era. They were first introduced in July 1938. They were normally obtained through a police precinct and bore the stamps of the corresponding issuing office and official. Every male German citizen aged 18 and older, and every Jewish citizen (both male and female) was issued one and was expected to produce it when confronted by officials.

Occupied countries

After World War II began, Nazi Germany began issuing these Kennkarten to citizens of conquered countries, such as in occupied Poland (General Government). They were issued to residents aged 15 and above, from 1941 to 1943, but they were often forged by the Polish resistance.

In the first weeks of the German occupation of Poland, pre-war documents issued by the Second Polish Republic were used for identification. On 26 October 1939, following a decree of Hans Frank, Kennkarten were announced. Due to legal arguments, the first cards were not issued until June 1941. German authorities continued to issue them until 1943. A Kennkarte was a sheet of thin cardboard, measuring about 30 by 14 cm (12 x 5.5 inches). It had two parallel folds, and text on both sides, making it a six-page document, with each page measuring 10 by 14 cm (5.5 x 4 inches). The color of a Kennkarte was based on ethnicity. Poles had gray ones; Jews and Romas, yellow; Russians, Ukrainians, Belarusians, Georgians and Goralenvolk, blue. Furthermore, letters were introduced to mark each ethnicity, based on the initial letter of the German word for the ethnicity (Juden, Weissrussen, Zigeuner etc) – J for Jews, U for Ukrainians, R for Russians, W for Belarusians, K for Georgians, G for Goralenvolk, Z for Roma (Gypsies). 

To receive a Kennkarte, an applicant had to fill out an application, and provide such documents as birth certificate, pre-war Polish ID, and marriage certificate (in specified cases). Polish citizens of appropriate ethnicity  were obliged to make a formal declaration that they belonged to the Aryan race. Upon receiving the card, applicants were fingerprinted. Since Polish-speaking civil servants were involved in the process, the cards were frequently forged, which allowed for members of the Home Army, and Polish Jews, to obtain a new identity. Furthermore, illegal printing shops manufacturing the Kennkarten operated in occupied Poland. The cards were available on the black market, for the price of 500 zlotys. According to the Gestapo, in 1943 in Warsaw there were up to 150,000 fake cards in circulation. The Home Army estimated that in late 1942, some 10% of residents of the General Government had fake Kennkarten.

Other important documents in Nazi-occupied Poland included:
 Ausweis, Arbeitskarte, Bescheinigung – issued by the workplace
 Erlaubniskarte – issued for entertainment workers (actors, etc.)

Sources 
 History of Kennkarte at Virtual Shtetl
Aryan papers

External links
Images

1938 introductions
Poland in World War II
Identity documents of Nazi Germany
German words and phrases